was a Japanese poet and mathematician. He was born on Sado Island in 1927. He graduated from Utsunomiya Agricultural College in 1948.

He began to write poems from the day after Japan had ended its role in World War II. Being inspired from surrealism and Heidegger, he wrote poems that ask the meaning of being. He was part of the VOU and Arechi poetry groups, and was awarded the Attilio Bertolucci Award for his poetry.

Takano also discovered a Machin-like formula for calculating pi.

Selected bibliography

References

20th-century Japanese mathematicians
21st-century Japanese mathematicians
People from Niigata Prefecture
2006 deaths
1927 births
20th-century Japanese poets